A commission is a formal document issued to appoint a named person to high office or as a commissioned officer in a territory's armed forces.  A commission constitutes documentary authority that the person named is vested with the powers of that office and is empowered to execute official acts.  A commission often takes the form of letters patent.  

Commissions are typically issued in the name of or signed by the head of state. In Commonwealth realms, the documentation is referred to a King's Commission or Queen's Commission (depending on the gender of the reigning monarch). However, in Commonwealth realms other than the United Kingdom, they may be signed by the governor-general, the representative of the monarch of that realm.

Terminology
Because the word "commission" can also refer generally to an individual's duty, the more specific terms commissioning parchment or commissioning scroll are often used to specify the commissioning document. However the document is not usually in the form of a scroll and is more often printed on paper instead of parchment.  In Canada, there is a differentiation in terminology according to rank; officers are accorded commissioning scripts.

Military and naval examples

Canada
Here is an example from Canada:

Canadian Commissioning Scripts, as they are properly called by NDHQ, are signed by the Governor General of Canada and countersigned by the Minister of National Defence, on behalf of the King of Canada.

Here is an example of the Royal Canadian Navy's Commission from pre-1968:

Sweden

Officers in the Swedish Armed Forces have not received written commissions since 1982 when a new employment structure was instituted by law. They are nowadays hired on contracts, as in any other civil service position. Prior to 1982 all officers received written certificates of commission, each signed by the King of Sweden.

The wording used prior to 1982 in translation would be;

United Kingdom
The following is typical of the wording of a British commission, and comes from the Royal Naval Reserve:

The above would be signed by the King (although a facsimile signature may be used) and countersigned by two members of the Admiralty Board.

Royal Navy pre-1964

Before the Board of Admiralty were merged into the Ministry of Defence in 1964, with the title of Lord High Admiral reverting to the Crown, the naval officer's commission was signed not by the Sovereign but by the Lords Commissioners of the Admiralty, executing the office of Lord High Admiral. The naval officer's commission was worded as follows:

Similarly the following is the wording of a Lieutenant's Commission from 1800:

It was signed by two Lords Commissioners of the Admiralty and a Secretary, i.e. a quorum of the Board of Admiralty.

United States
Article II, section 3, of the U.S. Constitution provides that the President "shall Commission all the Officers of the United States," including officers of the uniformed services as well as civilian officers.  Commissions of officers in the armed services are issued in the name of the President, although authority to sign on the President's behalf is generally exercised by the secretary of the department in which the officer is being commissioned.  This includes not only "commissioned officers" but also "commissioned warrant officers" (warrant officers in the pay grades of W-2 through W-5).  Warrant officers at the grade of W-1 are appointed by warrant by the secretary of their respective service, except in the Coast Guard where they are appointed by secretarial commission.

The commission of a newly commissioned officer reads :

At higher grade levels, appointments (including promotions) require Senate confirmation, and the wording of the commission reflects that fact:  "... I have nominated and, by and with the Advice and Consent of the Senate, do appoint..."

Examples of commissions to civil offices

United States
The Constitutional requirement mentioned above, that the President commission all officers of the United States, includes a wide range of civilian officials, including justices of the Supreme Court and other federal judges, the heads of executive departments, subcabinet level officials down to the level of assistant secretary, U.S. attorneys and marshals, diplomatic representatives, and members of the Foreign Service, among others.  Commissions are issued in the name of the President, either under his own signature or that of an official delegated to act on his behalf, and under either the Great Seal of the United States or, the seal of the executive department in which the appointment is made.

A typical commission for a Presidentially-appointed, Senate-confirmed civilian official in the Executive Branch would read:

For heads of executive departments and independent agencies, the Seal of the United States and the signature of the Secretary of State appears, but if the position is subordinate to the head of a different executive department, the seal of said executive department appears instead of the Seal of the United States and the signature of beforementioned head replaces the Secretary of State.

For certain positions, other characteristics such as "prudence" (for ambassadors) or "wisdom, uprightness, and learning" (for judges) may be used in addition to or instead of "integrity and ability."  If a position is for a fixed term of years or "during good behavior," the appropriate wording replaces the clause beginning "during the pleasure of the President."

Commissions of officers in the U.S. Foreign Service are also signed by the President.  The commission of a newly commissioned officer reads:

The commission is countersigned by the Secretary of State, and the singular Great Seal of the United States, entrusted to the Secretary under the 1789 statute creating the Department of State, is affixed.

States
Similar to the U.S. Constitution's provisions directing the President to commission executive officers of the U.S. Government, the state constitutions and/or laws provide for state (and sometimes local) officers to be commissioned; for example, Texas law directs the Texas governor to commission most state officers and elected county officers.

A person applying for a license to be a notary public receives a commission, generally indicating what political jurisdiction (state or District of Columbia) issued it, when it is valid (usually four years from issue) and the signature of the issuing authorities (usually the Governor and countersigned by the Secretary of State).

See also
Dormant commission
Roving commission
Purchase of commissions in the British Army

References

External links

 Army.ca Junior Officer's Guide
 Covey Crump (naval information)
 Commission, dated July 10, 1783 appointing George Vancouver fourth Lieutenant of HMS Fame
 Putting a Ship in commission The London Saturday Journal, 16 February 1839

Military personnel
Identity documents